Carsington is a village in the middle of the Derbyshire Dales, England; it adjoins the hamlet of Hopton, and is close to the historic town of Wirksworth and village of Brassington.

According to the 1991 Census, the population was 111, increasing to 251 at the 2011 Census.

History
Carsington has a long history, including Roman occupation (an old Roman settlement now lies beneath the reservoir). In prehistoric times, woolly rhinos lived in the area; the remains of one such animal were discovered nearby in the "Dream Cave" adjacent to the Callow and Hopton end of Summer Lane in the late 20th century.

Carsington is recorded in Domesday Book of 1086 as one of the berewicks (supporting farms) of the town and manor of Wirksworth. During the Middle Ages and right up until about 1800 it was a major location for lead mining and the lead obtained in the many Brassington and Carsington mines was usually smelted in Wirksworth.

The Channel 4 archaeology series Time Team once visited Carsington to investigate the archaeology and ancient remains in the pastures, where they visited a cave, discovered by  the Pegasus Caving Club, full of ancient human bones.

British aurochs specimen CPC98 was retrieved in 1998 from Carsington Pasture Cave, possess P mtDNA haplogroup sequences and radiocarbon dated to 6,738 ± 68 calibrated years BP. An aurochs is a kind of wild cattle.

Carsington today
Today, Carsington has one pub, the Miner's Arms, and a primary school. The community is primarily composed of a strong commuter and retiree contingent to replace the traditional agricultural, mining and quarrying community.

Carsington Reservoir, opened in 1992, stores water from the River Derwent and is operated by Severn Trent Water. It is open all year for recreation, with an extensive cycle path, several bird hides, a water sports and sailing centre. Inside the visitor centre are a trail, several specialist shops including an excellent and informative RSPB shop, and a café/restaurant.

The nearest railway station to Carsington is Wirksworth on the Ecclesbourne Valley Railway

See also
Listed buildings in Carsington

References

External links

"History of Wirksworth", Lutudarum.com – It is thought that Wirksworth is the site of the lost Roman town of Lutudarum

Villages in Derbyshire
Towns and villages of the Peak District
Derbyshire Dales